The 2012 NASCAR Toyota Series was the sixth NASCAR Series and the ninth organized by NASCAR Mexico. It was contested over 14 races. Chihuahua was added to calendar, while Guadalajara which was supposed to return after a one-year hiatus was later cancelled and replaced by Monterrey and Tuxtla Gutiérrez was also removed for the year. Germán Quiroga was the defending Driver's Champion however he left the series to compete in NASCAR Camping World Truck Series.

Teams and drivers 

37 drivers competed in the first race.

Driver changes 

 Three time champion Germán Quiroga left the category and his place in the Equipo Telcel.  Salvador Durán took his seat.
 Jorge Arteaga moved to K&N Pro Series East.
 Javier Razo ran with H&H Speed in the first two races.
 Héctor Félix began the season with Ramírez Racing, but changed to Anvi Motorsports after three races.
 Oscar Ruíz was incorporated to Suspension y Dirección team for the race in Aguascalientes.

2012 calendar 

The schedule was presented on January 19 with fourteen races in eight venues. Chihuahua debuted with a race at the El Dorado Speedway. Guadalajara was supposed to return after a year absence, however it was cancelled and replaced by Monterrey and Tuxtla Gutiérrez was also removed for the year.

‡ Night Race

Season summary 

The season began in Monterrey with the Regia 200. 37 drivers registered for the event; however an important absentee was the triple champion Germán Quiroga. Additionally,  the most popular driver winner, Jorge Arteaga, left the series. The race was marked by an accident that involved ten cars, which included Homero Richards who abandoned the race as a result. In the final lap, Rubén Rovelo passed Daniel Suárez to take the victory.

In the second race at Autódromo Potosino, Antonio Pérez started in fifth position and took the victory. Also in the race, Homero Richards had to drive the car of his teammate, Javier Razo, due to the breakdown of Richards' car.

In race three at Querétaro, Homero Richards achieved his tenth victory in the NTS in a GWC. The race was run 9 laps in excess. Rogelio López became the leader with a two point of advantage over Daniel Suárez.

Nocturna 200 was the fourth race in the season. Rogelio López took the pole position, and Daniel Suárez ultimately won the race. This was Suárez' first victory in NTS and he reached the number one position in the championship.

In the fifth race, Rubén García, Jr. (son of Rubén García Novoa), took his first pole position. García Jr clocked the track in 39.093 at 115.10 mph and became the youngest pole-sitter in NTS at age of 16. Jorge Goeters won the race in a GWC final. Goeters also took the first place in the championship, 11 points ahead of Daniel Suárez.

In the Aguascalientes 240, Antonio Pérez became the first driver to win two races in the season. Daniel Suárez came in second and Jorge Goeters finished third. In the championship, Suárez reduced his disadvantage to Goeters to nine points.

Results and standings

Races

Drivers

See also
2012 NASCAR Sprint Cup Series
2012 NASCAR Nationwide Series
2012 NASCAR Camping World Truck Series
2012 NASCAR K&N Pro Series East
2012 NASCAR Canadian Tire Series
2012 NASCAR Stock V6 Series
2012 Racecar Euro Series

References 

NASCAR Toyota Series

NASCAR Mexico Series